These are the late night Monday-Friday schedules on all three networks for each calendar season beginning September 1958. All times are Eastern and Pacific.

Talk shows are highlighted in yellow, local programming is white.

Schedule

+ formerly The Tonight Show
Beginning July 10, 1959, the Friday night shows were repeats of previous shows.

Sources

Castleman & Podrazik, The TV Schedule Book, McGraw-Hill Paperbacks, 1984
Brooks & Marsh, The Complete Directory To Prime-Time Network TV Shows, Ballantine, 1984
TV schedules, NEW YORK TIMES, September 1958-September 1959 (microfilm)

United States late night network television schedules
1958 in American television
1959 in American television